Uzbekistan Tennis Federation (UTF) is the governing body for professional and amateur tennis in Uzbekistan. It was originally accepted as associative member at the ITF in 1992. In 1993 UTF became the full member of ITF.

Uzbekistan Tennis Federation operates all of the Uzbekistan national representative tennis sides, including the Uzbekistan Davis Cup team, the Uzbekistan Fed Cup team and youth sides as well. UTF is also responsible for organizing and hosting all types of tennis tournaments in the Uzbekistan.

References

National members of the Asian Tennis Federation
Tennis in Uzbekistan
Tennis
2002 establishments in Uzbekistan
Sports organizations established in 2002